Taipei City Constituency I includes all of Beitou and part of Shilin in northern Taipei. The district acquired its present boundaries since 2008, when all local constituencies of the Legislative Yuan were reorganized to become single-member districts.

Current district
 Beitou
 Shilin: 2 sub-districts
 Tianmu: 8 urban villages
 Sanyu, Tianmu, Tianfu, Tianlu, Tianshou, Tianhe, Tianshan, Tianyu
 Lanya: 5 urban villages
 Dexing, Dehua, Zhongcheng, Lanya, Lanxing

Legislators

Election results

2008

2012

2016

References 

Constituencies in Taipei